The Rhythmic chart (also called Rhythmic Airplay, and previously named Rhythmic Songs, Rhythmic Top 40 and CHR/Rhythmic) is an airplay chart published weekly by Billboard magazine.

The chart tracks and measures the airplay of songs played on rhythmic radio stations, whose playlist includes mostly hit-driven R&B/hip-hop, rhythmic pop, and some dance tracks. Nielsen Audio sometimes refers to the format as rhythmic contemporary hit radio.

History
Billboard magazine first took notice of the newly emerged genre on February 27, 1987, when it launched the first crossover chart, Hot Crossover 30. It originally consisted of thirty titles and was based on reporting by eighteen stations, five of which were considered as pure rhythmic. The chart featured a mix of urban contemporary, top 40 and dance hits. In September 1989, Billboard split the Hot Crossover 30 chart in two:  Top 40/Dance and Top 40/Rock, the latter of which focused on rock titles which crossed over. By December 1990, Billboard eliminated the chart because more top 40 and R&B stations were becoming identical with the rhythmic-heavy playlist being played at the crossover stations at the time.

Billboard revived the chart in October 1992 as Top 40/Rhythm-Crossover, with the first number one being "End of the Road" by Boyz II Men. On June 25, 1997, it was renamed to Rhythmic Top 40 as a way to distinguish stations that continued to play a broad based rhythmic mix from those whose mix leaned heavily toward R&B and hip-hop. It was changed to Rhythmic Airplay in the February 7, 2004, issue and shortened to Rhythmic on July 12, 2008.
The current number one song is "Players" by Coi Leray.

Chart criteria
There are forty positions on this chart and it is solely based on radio airplay. 66 rhythmic radio stations are electronically monitored 24 hours a day, seven days a week by Nielsen Broadcast Data Systems. Songs are ranked based on the number of plays that each song received during that week.

Songs receiving the greatest growth will receive a "bullet", although there are tracks that will also get bullets if the loss in detections doesn't exceed the percentage of downtime from a monitored station. "Airpower" awards are issued to songs that appear on the top 20 of both the airplay and audience chart for the first time, while the "greatest gainer" award is given to song with the largest increase in detections. A song with six or more spins in its first week is awarded an "airplay add". If a song is tied for the most spins in the same week, the one with the biggest increase that previous week will rank higher, but if both songs show the same amount of spins regardless of detection the song that is being played at more stations is ranked higher. Songs that fall below the top 15 and have been on the chart after 20 weeks are removed.

Records and achievements

Most weeks at number one

15 weeks
 "No Scrubs" — TLC (1999)
14 weeks
 "Twisted" — Keith Sweat (1996)
13 weeks
 "Freak Me" — SilK (1993)
 "You Make Me Wanna..." — Usher (1997-1998)
12 weeks
 "I'll Make Love to You" — Boyz II Men (1994)
 "Fantasy" — Mariah Carey (1995)
 "Lollipop" — Lil Wayne featuring Static Major (2008)
11 weeks
 "Shoop" — Salt-n-Pepa (1993-1994)
 "Dilemma" — Nelly featuring Kelly Rowland (2002)

Artists with most number-one singles

Artists with most entries

See also
Dance/Mix Show Airplay
Mainstream Top 40
List of artists who reached number one on the U.S. Rhythmic chart

References

External links
Current Billboard Rhythmic Songs chart (updated weekly)

Billboard charts